CGTL can be an abbreviation for:
 General Confederation of Labour of Luxembourg
 General Confederation of Lebanese Workers
 Continuous Green Trough Lane, a part of a Seagull intersection, also known as Florida-T intersection